Zhihengliuella alba is a Gram-positive, non-motile, white-pigmented, short rod actinobacterium.

References

Further reading
Sneath, Peter HA, et al. Bergey's manual of systematic bacteriology. Volume 5. Williams & Wilkins, 2012.

External links

LPSN
Type strain of Zhihengliuella alba at BacDive -  the Bacterial Diversity Metadatabase

Micrococcaceae
Bacteria described in 2009